A Chorus Line is a 1985 American musical comedy-drama film directed by Richard Attenborough, and starring Michael Douglas and Terrence Mann. The screenplay by Arnold Schulman is based on the book of the 1975 stage production of the same name by James Kirkwood Jr. and Nicholas Dante. It is the first film adaptation of the stage production. The songs were composed by Marvin Hamlisch and Edward Kleban. The plot centers on a group of dancers auditioning for a part in a new Broadway musical.

Released theatrically on December 13, 1985, by Columbia Pictures, the film received mixed reviews from critics, who compared it unfavorably with the musical, and was a box office bomb, grossing only $14 million from a $25 million budget.

Plot 
In a Broadway theater, from a darkened place in the audience, director Zach (Michael Douglas) judges dozens of dancers and their performances. After initial eliminations, sixteen hopefuls remain. Arriving late is former lead dancer Cassie (Alyson Reed) who once had a tempestuous romantic relationship with Zach but left him for Hollywood. Now she has not worked in over a year, and is desperate enough to be part of the chorus line.

Zach is looking for eight dancers (four men and four women) and has them introduce themselves. As they each step forward, he interviews them and coaxes the dancers into talking about a variety of topics. This includes how they began dancing, first sexual experiences, their families, and hardships they've faced. Through their stories, the group reveals how being a performer is a difficult profession.

As Cassie enters the stage, Zach tells Larry to take all the dancers to a rehearsal room. Cassie pleads to continue the audition. Zach relents and sends her to learn the routine with everyone else. Paul re-enters the stage and tells Zach about how he was sexually molested as a child while watching musicals on 42nd Street. Paul describes his first job at a drag cabaret. When his parents found out that he was gay and performing in drag, they couldn't look him in the eye. Zach embraces Paul, showing compassion for the first time in the audition.

Larry brings the dancers back onstage to perform the newly learned routine. Zach shouts at Cassie, as she cannot blend in. They argue about their past romantic relationship while Larry leads the group in a tap combination. Suddenly, Paul slips, falls and injures his knee. As he is rushed to the hospital, Zach asks the dancers what they will do once they can no longer perform. Diana is the only one that can truly answer the question, telling him that she wants to be remembered, even just for dancing in a chorus, which all the hopefuls seem to agree with. Zach chooses Val, Cassie, Bebe, Diana, Mike, Mark, Richie, and Bobby to be in his line.

Months later, the eight performers are seen performing "One" in front of an audience. As the song progresses, the cut dancers also appear onstage and it becomes harder to identify each dancer. The dancer's reflections from the mirror joins them and soon the stage is filled with hundreds of dancers. As the credits roll, the song's tag vamps as the dancers continue dancing in a giant kickline.

Cast 
 Michael Douglas as Zach, choreographer
 Alyson Reed as Cassie
 Terrence Mann as Larry, assistant choreographer
 Sharon Brown as Kim, Zach's secretary

Dancers

Musical numbers 
 "I Hope I Get It" – Entire cast—Contains new sections of music not in the original stage version
 "Who Am I Anyway?" – Paul—his solo, originally part of "I Hope I Get It"
 "I Can Do That" – Mike
 "At the Ballet" – Sheila, Bebe and Maggie—the soundtrack contains an extended version not heard in the film
 "Surprise, Surprise" – Richie and dancers—replaces "Hello Twelve, Hello Thirteen, Hello Love" and "Gimme the Ball", although one verse of the song is heard in the film. The monologues of Mark, Connie, Judy, and Greg which are part of this number are performed in other parts of the film without music.
 "Nothing" – Diana
 "Dance: Ten; Looks: Three" – Val
 "Let Me Dance for You" – Cassie—replaces her song "The Music and the Mirror", although part of the instrumental section remains the same
 "One" (rehearsal) – entire cast
 "What I Did for Love" – Cassie—sung counterpoint to the Tap Combination. In the stage version, the company performs the number, with Diana leading.
 "One" (Finale) – entire cast (8 kicklines of 17 dancers each)

The songs "And...", “Sing!”, and "The Tap Combination" from the stage version are eliminated in the film, as well as most of "The Montage" ("Hello Twelve, Hello Thirteen, Hello Love").

Charts

Production 

Even before the show had premiered on Broadway, Hollywood producers had expressed interest in a motion picture version of the musical. Universal Pictures acquired the rights for $5.5 million, in addition to agreeing to pay royalties of 20% of the distributor's gross rentals above $30 million, with the stage musical's director Michael Bennett hired as producer and director. Bennett declined to participate when his proposal to present the film as an audition to cast the movie version of the stage play, instead of a literal translation of the play (cf. the 1971 film adaptation of The Boy Friend) was rejected. Many directors turned down the project, insisting that not only was A Chorus Line too beloved, but it would not translate well to the screen. In addition, the requirement to start paying royalties after the gross reached $30 million—by which time the film might not yet have broken even—made the film a difficult financial prospect. When Attenborough accepted the project in 1984, there was some apprehension as to the treatment the British director would give the musical's quintessentially American story.

Universal sold the rights to PolyGram for $7.8 million in 1982 and in 1983 Embassy Pictures joined as co-producers, investing 20% in Embassy Film Associates, which financed the picture.

In February 1984, according to Attenborough, the singer Madonna auditioned at the Royale Theatre on Broadway for a dance role in the movie using her birth name of Ciccone. He rejected her.

The dance numbers were choreographed by Jeffrey Hornaday.

Matt West, Vicki Frederick, Pam Klinger, Justin Ross, and Alyson Reed had all appeared in A Chorus Line on Broadway or in other major productions of the stage show prior to appearing in the film version. Gregg Burge, Charles McGowan, and Blane Savage joined stage productions of A Chorus Line after filming the movie.

Audrey Landers could move well but was not a trained dancer as was the rest of the cast. Attenborough cast her in the film despite her lack of formal dance training. She is absent from some of the more difficult choreographed dance numbers.

The decision to tamper with the score disappointed fans of the show. "Hello Twelve, Hello Thirteen, Hello Love," "Sing!," and "The Music and the Mirror" were deleted (the first was touched on briefly) and new songs "Surprise, Surprise" and "Let Me Dance For You" were added. The show's breakout tune, "What I Did for Love," was originally performed by Diana as a paean to dancers and their dedication to their craft, but in the film it becomes a wistful love song by Cassie about Zach as she leaves the stage. Another change from the stage show to the movie sees the character of Bebe being selected as one of the final eight dancers, rather than Judy.

The stage musical was one of the first productions to address the subject of gay actors within the theatre. However, the film version opted instead to make a more "family friendly" film by dealing less with the experiences of gay actors.

Six months prior to release, Embassy Pictures was sold to The Coca-Cola Company, who also owned Columbia Pictures. Five months later, Dino DeLaurentiis acquired Embassy but he did not acquire the 20% interest in Embassy Film Associates, which created some confusion over who would handle the film, which was already scheduled to be distributed by Columbia.

Reception

Critical response 
In his review in The New York Times, Vincent Canby observed, "Though it was generally agreed that Hair would not work as a film, Miloš Forman transformed it into one of the most original pieces of musical cinema of the last 20 years. Then they said that A Chorus Line couldn't be done—and this time they were right...Mr. Attenborough has elected to make a more or less straightforward film version that is fatally halfhearted."

Roger Ebert of the Chicago Sun-Times stated, "The result may not please purists who want a film record of what they saw on stage, but this is one of the most intelligent and compelling movie musicals in a long time—and the most grown up, since it isn't limited, as so many contemporary musicals are, to the celebration of the survival qualities of geriatric actresses."

Variety said, "Chorus often seems static and confined, rarely venturing beyond the immediate. Attenborough merely films the stage show as best he could. Nonetheless, the director and lenser Ronnie Taylor have done an excellent job working within the limitations, using every trick they could think of to keep the picture moving. More importantly, they have a fine cast, good music and a great, popular show to work with. So if all they did was get it on film, that's not so bad."

Time Out London says, "The grit and drive of the original have been dissipated into studiously unkempt glitz as empty as plasticised pop ... It's too corny and unbelievable for words."

Kelly Bishop, the original stage Sheila, noted, "It was appalling when director Richard Attenborough went on a talk show and said 'this is a story about kids trying to break into show business.' I almost tossed my TV out the window; I mean what an idiot! It's about veteran dancers looking for one last job before it's too late for them to dance anymore. No wonder the film sucked!"

On Rotten Tomatoes  the film has an approval rating of 40% based on reviews from 35 critics. The website's critics consensus states: "On stage, A Chorus Line pulled back the curtain to reveal the hopes and fears of showbiz strivers, but that energy and urgency is lost in the transition to the big screen." On Metacritic the film has a score of 46% based on reviews from 13 critics, indicating "mixed or average reviews".

Accolades

Home media 
A Chorus Line was released to DVD by MGM Home Entertainment on April 15, 2003, as a Region 1 widescreen DVD, with a re-release in new packaging on January 14, 2014, and a Blu-ray release on the same date.

In culture 
In season 6, episode 10 of the American medical drama House, Dr. Gregory House buys a A Chorus Line poster, while Dr. James Wilson hums the final score of the movie and musical in the episode finale.

References

External links 

 
 
 
 
 

1980s musical comedy-drama films
1985 films
American dance films
American LGBT-related films
1985 LGBT-related films
American musical comedy-drama films
1980s English-language films
Films scored by Marvin Hamlisch
Films about musical theatre
Films based on musicals
Films directed by Richard Attenborough
Films set in New York City
PolyGram Filmed Entertainment films
LGBT-related musical comedy-drama films
Films set in a theatre
Columbia Pictures films
Embassy Pictures films
Backstage musicals
1980s American films